Stallergenes Greer International AG is a global biopharmaceutical company headquartered in Baar, Switzerland, specializing in the diagnosis and treatment of respiratory allergies through immunotherapy.

Stallergenes Greer International AG is the parent company of GREER Laboratories, Inc. (registered office in the U.S.) and Stallergenes S.A.S. (registered office in France).

With 1035 employees in 2021, Stallergenes Greer operates in 19 countries.

Stallergenes Greer's core manufacturing facilities are located both in Europe (Antony and Amilly in France) and in the USA (Lenoir, North Carolina and San Diego, California).

History
Stallergenes was founded in 1962 by Institut Mérieux  In 2015, Stallergenes and Greer Laboratories Inc. merged to form Stallergenes Greer, "a worldwide leader in allergy immunotherapy".

Greer was founded by R.T. Greer, a collecter of source materials (i.e. : roots, herbs, pollens) in 1904.

Stallergenes Greer is a privately held company owned by B-Flexion (ex Waypoint Capital), chaired by Ernesto Bertarelli.

Activity 
Stallergenes Greer is specialised in allergy immunotherapy treatments. It includes Name Patient Products (NPP) which are allergen products, prepared in accordance with prescriptions for individual patients.

The product portfolio covers different segments including: sublingual products (Staloral®, Oralair®, Actair®), subcutaneous products (Alustal®/Phostal®, Alyostal®/Albey®), allergen extracts available as bulk extract or NPP, veterinary products, testing supplies, source materials and other supplies like sterile diluents, sterile empty vials.

Board of directors 
The board of directors includes:

Stefan Meister, Chairman
Michele Antonelli, Chief Executive Officer
Giampero De Luca, Board member

A pharmaceutical and clinical development programme 

Since 2003, Stallergenes has been involved in a clinical development programme whose objective is to develop proprietary medicines intended to cover the main allergens responsible for more than 80% of respiratory allergies. 

Oralair is the first sublingual immunotherapy tablet resulting from this programme. Oralair is marketed in 22 countries and has been approved by the Food and Drug Administration in the United States.

The second project in this programme is the house dust mite immunotherapy tablet Actair which is marketed in Japan, Australia, and New Zealand, and South Korea under the brand name Actair and in Germany under the brand name Orylmyte.

In 2021, Stallergenes Greer is partnering with Aptar Pharma to develop novel connected device for allergen immunotherapy treatment delivery. It will contribute to improving adherence, thus optimising treatment outcomes.

References

External links

Pharmaceutical companies of France
Allergology
Pharmaceutical companies of the United Kingdom
Companies based in Île-de-France